Taylor John Williams (born June 6, 1991) is an American singer-songwriter best known for his appearance on NBC's reality TV singing competition The Voice Season 7 and finished in the semi-finals taking fifth place.

Early life
Taylor was born in Eugene, Oregon. Taylor is a graduate of the Sheldon High School.  After graduating from Sheldon, Williams enrolled at Portland State University before dropping out to pursue his music. He worked at a dog hotel in order to support himself while pursuing music.

Career

Early days
In 2009, he sang the Academy Award-winning song “Falling Slowly” at his Sheldon High School graduation ceremony. That same year, Taylor released an independent EP “Proverbial Elephant" on Grooveshark.

2014: The Voice
In September 2014, it was announced that Williams would compete in  Season 7 of NBC's The Voice. In his "Blind Audition," he performed an acoustic cover of Kanye West's "Heartless," which caused Adam Levine and Gwen Stefani to press their "I Want You" buttons and turn their chairs. Williams chose Gwen Stefani as his coach. In the Battle rounds, he defeated fellow Team Gwen member Amanda Lee Peers, dueting Dolly Parton's "Jolene," and advanced to the Knockout rounds. During the Knockouts, Williams covered "Mad World" by Tears for Fears, in which he defeated his opponent Troy Ritchie and advanced to The Live Playoffs. During the Playoffs, Taylor sang  Stealers Wheel's "Stuck in the Middle with You" and was voted through by America. In the following weeks, he covered "If," "Come Together" by The Beatles, and "Royals" by Lorde, all of which caused him to be voted through by America. During the Semifinals, he covered both "Falling Slowly" by Glen Hansard & Markéta Irglová and "Blank Space" by Taylor Swift. Williams was within the bottom 3 in voting and thus was eliminated. However, like eight other eliminated artists, Taylor was given the opportunity to reenter the competition and participate in the finals as the "Wildcard" finalist. In this new Wildcard round, Williams covered "Wicked Game" by Chris Isaak. Contestant Damien from Adam Levine's team was selected as the Wildcard finalist, ultimately eliminating Williams from the competition.

 – Studio version of performance reached the top 10 on iTunes

Artistry

Influences
His diverse style is influenced by artists from a wide range of genres such as Glen Hansard, Amos Lee, Jeff Buckley, Jack White, Jay-Z and Bill Withers.

Discography

Studio albums
2017: El Dorado

2016: Hiraeth (EP)

2015: Song of a Deadman (EP)

References

1991 births
Living people
Musicians from Eugene, Oregon
The Voice (franchise) contestants
Singers from Oregon
21st-century American singers
21st-century American male singers